The men's skeet competition at the 1998 Asian Games in Bangkok, Thailand was held on 8 and 9 December at the Hua Mark Shooting Range.

Schedule
All times are Thailand Standard Time (UTC+07:00)

Records

Results

Qualification

Final

References 

 ISSF Results Overview

Men Shotgun S